Trinity College London ESOL is an international English Language examinations board delivering assessments in English language learning and teaching and has been offering English language examinations since 1938. Trinity College London's exams are taken by over 850,000 candidates in over 60 countries each year.

Language certificates offered include English for Speakers of Other Languages (ESOL) for non-native speakers of English (learning) and Teaching English for Speakers of Other Languages (TESOL) for teachers of non-native speakers of English (teaching). Trinity College London provides the following examinations:

Secure English Language Test (SELT)
Secure English Language Tests (SELTs) are provided at ten Trinity SELT centres in the UK only. The tests are approved for applications to UK Visas and Immigration (UKVI) for visas, British Citizenship and Leave to Remain (LTR). The approved SELTs are Graded Examinations in Spoken English (GESE) at CEFR A1, A2 and B1 levels; Integrated Skills in English (ISE) at B1, B2 and C1 levels.

Graded Examinations in Spoken English (GESE) 
The Graded Examinations in Spoken English (GESE) test candidates' ability in listening and speaking. There are four Stages with three Grades at each Stage:
 Grades 1-3 (Initial stage)
 Grades 4-6 (Elementary stage)
 Grades 7-9 (Intermediate stage)
 Grades 10-12 (Advanced stage)

Integrated Skills in English (ISE) 
Integrated Skills in English examinations (ISE) assess all four language skills: Speaking, Writing, Listening and Reading – interacting with each other as they do in the real world making them suitable assessments for many business and academic organisations. There are five ISE levels: ISE Foundation, ISE I, ISE II, ISE III, ISE IV.

ISE  tests are accepted by the UK government for settlement and visa purposes. ISE qualifications are used as robust evidence of English language proficiency and are recognised by an ever growing number of universities, governments and institutions around the world. ISE is available at five levels from A2 to C2 on the Common European Framework (CEFR). ISE is a contemporary four skills exam containing two modules: Reading & Writing and Speaking & Listening. These modules can be taken together, or at different times.

Learners can choose to take ISE exams on their own or combine them with the spoken grades (GESE) as they progress in their English language abilities.

Objectives 
To provide evidence of the candidates’ proficiency across four skills in English language: reading, writing, speaking and listening. Candidates may use an ISE qualification to provide evidence of their English language ability across Common European Framework of Reference (CEFR) levels: A2, B1, B2, C1 and C2. ISE is suitable for any candidate (young person or adult) either in or entering into an educational context. ISE has been designed to reflect the type of tasks and texts students encounter within the educational domain.

Assessment methods 
ISE Foundation to ISE III Reading & Writing is assessed using dichotomous scoring and rating scales. ISE Foundation to ISE III Speaking & Listening is assessed using rating scales. One Independent Listening task in ISE Foundation and ISE I is scored. The overall result for each unit is taken by converting the total score into one of the following results:  Distinction - Merit  - Pass -  Fail. ISE IV Reading & Writing and Speaking & Listening is assessed by means of one overall criterion, Task fulfilment. This is assessed in each phase of the Interview using a four-point scale (A–D). The examiner assesses the candidate's performance in each phase of the exam by awarding a letter grade: A, B, C or D:

A — Distinction (reflects an excellent performance)

B — Merit (reflects a good performance)

C — Pass (reflects a satisfactory performance)

D — Fail (reflects an unsatisfactory performance).

UK ESOL Examinations 
These certificates are for ESOL learners in England, Wales and Northern Ireland, designed in accordance with the UK Adult ESOL Core Curriculum.

ESOL Skills for Life certificates
These assessments are offered in Speaking and Listening, Reading and Writing and are available from Entry 1 to Level 2 in the Regulated Qualifications Framework (RQF). Trinity is the only examinations board to also offer pre-RQF assessments (non-accredited) in Speaking and Listening – ESOL Step 1 and Step 2.

ESOL Skills for Life is externally assessed by a Trinity examiner.

Teaching Qualifications (TESOL/TEFL) 
Trinity College London also offers TESOL (Teaching of English to Speakers of Other Languages) qualifications - this is also known sometimes as TEFL or TESL qualifications. Trinity's TESOL qualifications are widely recognised by employers and authorities around the world.

Qualifications range from those starting out in a teaching career to senior teaching and management posts. 

 Certificate in TESOL (CertTESOL)
 Teaching Young Learners English Certificate (TYLEC)
 Trinity Teach English Online
 Certificate in Online Teaching (CertOT)
 Certificate for Practising Teachers (CertPT)
 Diploma in TESOL (DipTESOL)

Academic Recognition 
Trinity ESOL qualifications are accredited by the UK Qualifications and Curriculum Authority QCA, and its respective partners in Wales and Northern Ireland.  They are listed in the UK's UCAS (University and Colleges Admissions Services) guide to qualifications acceptable as evidence of English language competency.

UCAS considers an English language competency equivalent to NQF Levels 1 or 2 as appropriate for entry to UK Higher Education. The UCAS guides list the following Trinity ESOL qualifications acceptable as evidence of proficiency in English.

Comparison table for Trinity ESOL, Cambridge English Language Assessment and IELTS examinations

Worldwide accreditation varies from country to country.

Link to Common European Framework of Reference (CEFR) 
The Trinity suite of exams are linked to the Common European Framework of Reference for Languages(CEFR). This framework sets standards in foreign language learning/teaching across Europe, by categorising learners into six levels of ability. The

Trinity ESOL exams fit into this framework as shown in the table

See also 
English as an additional language
Teaching English as a Foreign Language

References

External links 
About Trinity College London
Trinity College ESOL
Trinity College TESOL
Trinity College TESOL Course Search
International Exam Recognition

English language tests
Organizations established in 1938